Lithurgus atratus is a species of bee in the family Megachilidae, the mason bees. It is a host of Chaetodactylus ludwigi, a bee mite.

References

External links
 Lithurgus atratus. Integrated Taxonomic Information System (ITIS).
 Lithurgus atratus. Animal Diversity Web.
 Lithurgus atratus. Biodiversity India.

Megachilidae
Insects of Sri Lanka
Insects described in 1853